Alexander Iosifovich Trishatny (1870 – after 1920) — a Russian right wing politician, one of the founders and leaders of the Union of the Russian People (URP), a loyalist right-wing nationalist party, the most important among Black-Hundredist monarchist and antisemitic political organizations in the Russian Empire of 1905–1917; Deputy Chairman of URP, member of its first Board and one of the authors of the URP Charter. Concurrently, in 1905 was a leader of URP peripheral branch in Yaroslavl.

Family 

Alexander Trishatny was born in 1870. A graduated engineer (university unknown). Collegiate secretary (title of X class; awarded to the best graduates of high school).

Date of disappearance for Alexander Trishatny is set by the last day when Sergei Trishatny was seen in Petrograd under the Cheka detention, because the protocols of Sergei's interrogations do not mention his brother Alexander as dead or wanted.

Union of Russian People 
Trishatny was chosen as one of two deputy chairmen of the URP, and was an organizer of an extensive regional network of URP local branches throughout the whole Russian Empire. It was on  when Trishatny with I. N. Katzaurov set up the first URP peripheral city branch in Yaroslavl. Alexander Dubrovin, the URP chairman says about 60 peripheral party branches set up at the start-up period through the country due to the efforts of Trishatny.

On  Alexander Trishatny attended, in a delegation of his party, the reception of czar Nicholas II. At this reception Trishatny gave a speech having read out a letter to the czar from the URP members of Yaroslavl, as a leader of this branch. The central point of this address to Nicholas II was a question, whether he shall preserve the foundations of autocracy in Russia. It is said, that the czar answered that "soon the sun of truth will shine over Russia and new laws will be issued that shall soothe everybody and dispel all doubts."

Alexander Trishatny is also named among those who wrote the Charter of the URP. In October 1906 Trishatny developed a guidance document Programme of organizational activities for the members of the Union of Russian People.

The organizational structure he proposed (and later, introduced) was a paramilitary network. Each 10 members composed desyatka ("ten") which was a primary unit under the command of desyatnik. Each 10 "tens" constituted a sotnya ("hundred") subordinated to sotnik; each 10 "hundreds" constituted a tysyacha ("thousand") subordinated to tysyachnik (modernized word tysyatsky).

See also
Alexander Dubrovin
Black Hundreds
List of people who disappeared
Sergei Trishatny
Union of the Russian People

Sources

Works
 Русскому народу // Приложение к Симбирским епархиальным ведомостям. 1906. № 19. — Симбирск
 За кулисами «освободительного» движения // Русское знамя. 1907. 6 янв.
 Где искать выхода? — СПб., 1907
 Правда о Союзе Русского Народа. — Томск, 1910.

References

1870 births
1920s missing person cases
Anti-Masonry
Antisemitism in the Russian Empire
Members of the Union of the Russian People
Missing person cases in Russia
Russian anti-communists
Russian monarchists
Russian nationalists
Year of death missing